Wayne Wright Connally (March 19, 1923 – December 20, 2000) was an American politician. He served as a Democratic member for the 58th district of the Texas House of Representatives. He also served as a member for the 21st district of the Texas Senate.

Life and career
Born in Floresville, Texas, the son of Lela and John Connally Sr. His brother was John Connally, later governor of Texas. He graduated from Floresville High School in 1940 and attended the University of Texas at Austin.

Connally served in the United States Army Air Forces during World War II for three years until February 1946, and later joined his brother John in politics. In 1965, Connally was elected to represent the 58th district of the Texas House of Representatives. In 1967, he was elected to the Texas Senate in the 21st district, succeeding Abraham Kazen. He was succeeded by John Traeger in 1973.

Connally moved to Cody, Wyoming and lived there until his death in December 2000 at the age of 77. His body was cremated.

References

1923 births
2000 deaths
20th-century American politicians
People from Floresville, Texas
People from Wilson County, Texas
People from Park County, Wyoming
Democratic Party members of the Texas House of Representatives
Democratic Party Texas state senators
University of Texas at Austin alumni
United States Army Air Forces soldiers